BT TV is a subscription IPTV service offered by BT; a division of United Kingdom telecommunications company BT Group, and was originally launched as BT Vision in December 2006. As of the end of June 2019, BT TV had 1.9 million customers.

BT TV uses the YouView platform, so offers Freeview channels via DTT along with YouView's additional on-demand content, as well as 30 extra entertainment channels (18 of which are available in HD), 9 extra children's channels, 11 movie channels (Sky Cinema), 5 live sports channels (BT Sport & Sky Sports) and other on-demand services delivered through IPTV. BT Sport channels are available in SD and HD through IPTV signals. BT Sport, ESPN and AMC from BT are available in non-fibre areas over IPTV using copper multicast where available. As BT TV transmits channels and content through IPTV, BT requires customers to sign up to the BT Broadband internet and phone service to use BT TV, with connection via BT's official router, BT Home Hub.

BT started rebranding its TV services – BT Vision and its YouView service as BT TV between May and August 2013. On 11 April 2014, BT announced that the original Vision service would be closed down as of 30 June, with all customers getting a free upgrade to its modern YouView service. The Vision service was, after August 2013, solely used to broadcast Sky Sports, as well as BT Sport for non-Infinity customers. Sky Sports 1 & 2 were made available to YouView customers on Tuesday 16 December 2014 following an interim ruling from the Appeal Court backing Ofcom's ruling that YouView is to be included in the "Wholesale Must Offer" of the channels.

History

Background
When British Telecom (BT) was privatised in 1984, it was barred from providing television broadcasts over its telecommunication network, which meant that it was not possible for BT to provide a cable television service. The ban was designed to protect the new smaller telecommunications companies and the small cable television networks in the United Kingdom as it was felt that BT had an unfair advantage because its pre-privatisation monopoly meant that its equipment was already installed in virtually every home and business in the country. In January 2001, the ban was lifted.

Despite the ban on BT offering cable services, it did offer to customers in the 1990s analogue satellite receivers compatible with the Astra satellite system (with built-in VideoCrypt decoders for receiving the Sky Multichannels package); these boxes were rebadged versions of receivers built by other companies, such as the BT SVS200 being a Cambridge ARD200.

Launch
BT Vision was launched on 5 December 2006, competing with Sky, Virgin Media (then known as NTL:Telewest) and TalkTalk Plus TV (then known as Tiscali TV). Initial industry reaction was positive although there was some criticism that set up costs were expensive and it was noted that BT Group were entering a competitive market. In May 2007, BT Group launched a national advertising campaign for BT Vision. BT Vision was the second IPTV television platform in the UK, after Homechoice TV.

The aim was to attract "hundreds of thousands" of customers by the end of 2007 and 2–3 million in the medium-term. However, adoption was slow and by February 2008 BT Vision had just 150,000 customers.

Premium sport deal
BT acquired the rights to carry 242 same-day (but not live) Premier League football matches per season in a three-year deal covering the 2007–08, 2008–09 and 2009–10 seasons in a joint bid with BSkyB on 25 May 2006, prior to BT Vision's launch. BT Vision also have the right to offer on demand coverage of 125 matches each season from the Football League and League Cup. This service ceased prior to the start of the 2010–11 season.

Between August 2007 and June 2009, Setanta Sports was available through BT Vision, via DTT and a smart card, offering live Premiership and Scottish Premier League games, as well as other sporting events such as US PGA Tour Golf and Magners League Rugby. BT Vision made a deal with American sports TV company ESPN for carriage of its new channel which replaced Setanta on DTT.

The company announced the pricing of their Sky Sports packages in July 2010, following the outcome of Ofcom's review into pay-TV pricing in March, which directed Sky to reduce the wholesale price it charges for the Sky Sports channels. The price charged to customers signing up for broadband, calls and TV with BT for a two-year contract results in the organisation making a "significant loss on the service", allowing them to undercut the price charged by Sky to its own customers.

Microsoft deal
On 7 January 2008, BT reached a deal with Microsoft where the latter's Xbox 360 console would have provided BT Vision's on demand content. The service was due to launch in mid-2008 but never materialised.

Sky Sports deal
On 28 June 2010, BT and Sky signed an agreement where Sky Sports 1 and 2 will be available for BT Vision customers. This came a year after BT stopped offering Setanta Sports 1 & 2 on Vision after Setanta lost the rights to broadcast Premier League football.

UKTV deal
On 22 March 2012, it was announced that BT would offer UKTV original content on-demand from later in the day. Featured programmes include James Martin's Mediterranean (Good Food), Choccywoccydoodah (Good Food), Extreme Makeover: Home Edition (Home), Celebrity Fantasy Homes (Home), Tool Academy (Really), Bridezillas (Really), Amazing Planet (Eden) and Life on Fire (Eden).

As part of the deal, UKTV started streaming linear channels to BT Vision set top boxes later in 2012. The first three were Watch, GOLD and Alibi; further channels Good Food, Eden and Home were to launch at a later date. Dave, Really and Yesterday will likely not launch on the service as they are already available on Freeview, which is available through the BT set-top boxes.

Fox deal
On 11 April 2012, BT and Fox International Channels announced that from late 2012, BT Vision customers would be able to watch FX (which became Fox) as a linear channel. BT Vision customers were also able to watch many of the top shows, up to seven days after transmission on-demand and watch library programmes on-demand.

On 1 March 2016, Fox was removed from the BT TV line-up.

National Geographic Channel and Nat Geo Wild deal
On 12 June 2012, BT announced that National Geographic Channel and Nat Geo Wild would be coming to BT Vision as linear channels in late 2012. The deal also included a seven-day on demand catch up of programmes.

Premier League football rights 
On 13 June 2012, it was announced that BT had acquired a share of the rights to Premier League football television coverage for the 2013–14 to 2015–16 seasons. As part of the deal, BT acquired the live rights to 38 games, including 18 of the 38 "first pick" games, for a total of £738 million. BT simultaneously announced plans to launch a Sports Channel on all platforms, including BT Vision.

Premiership Rugby rights 
On 12 September 2012, BT agreed a £152 million four-year exclusive rights deal for the broadcast of Premiership Rugby from the 2013–14 season.

British Eurosport deal
On 8 November 2012, BT signed a contract with British Eurosport to add British Eurosport 1 and 2 to its line-up of linear TV channels. The deal included sporting content to watch on demand. On-demand content was later removed but re-added in mid 2018 following the signing of a new deal with Eurosport's current owners Discovery.

Sky Cinema deal
On 14 October 2013, BT signed a deal with Sky for the carriage of their Sky Movies (now known as Sky Cinema) channels and on-demand content. The channels were available to customers from 26 October.

Netflix Deal
On 10 November 2014 BT and YouView announced that the Netflix player had been made available on BT & retail Humax YouView boxes. In addition BT announced a tie in deal with Netflix, where you can subscribe to Netflix and pay through your BT TV bill.

AMC Deal
On 4 August 2015 BT and AMC Networks International announced that they would be launching the AMC channel for the first time in the UK exclusively for BT customers. The channel launched on 28 August 2015 and was also available to order free of charge on all BT TV packages and to Sky TV customers who also subscribe to the BT Sports Pack.

Amazon deal
On 21 June 2018 BT announced that Amazon Prime Video will be available through BT TV.

Now TV deal
On 3 April 2020 it was announced Now TV will be available through BT TV.

Discovery deal
On 28 November 2022, Discovery is launched on BT TV Player.

Available channels
The following is a list of live TV channels on the BT TV platforms with their EPG numbers, correct as of 13 February 2023. All channels are offered to the viewer via IPTV with the relevant subscription from BT TV:
NOW Entertainment Pass

313: Sky News
314: NBC News Now
320: Discovery
340: Sky Showcase
341: Sky Witness
342: Sky Atlantic
343: Alibi
344: Gold
345: Comedy Central
346: Sky Max
347: Sky Comedy
348: Sky Sci-Fi
349: Sky Crime
350: Sky Arts
351: MTV
352: Sky Documentaries
353: Sky History
354: Sky Nature
466: Cartoon Network
467: Boomerang
468: Nickelodeon
469: Nicktoons
470: Nick Jr.
471: Cartoonito
472: Sky Kids

Asian Mix

390: SET
391: Sony Max
392: Utsav Plus HD
393: Utsav Gold HD
394: Zee TV HD
395: Zee Cinema HD
396: Colors TV
397: Colors Cineplex

NOW Entertainment Pass - HD & 4K bolt-on

325: Discovery HD
355: Sky Showcase HD
356: Sky Witness HD
357: Sky Atlantic HD
358: Alibi HD
359: Gold HD
360: Comedy Central HD
361: Sky Max HD
362: Sky Comedy HD
363: Sky Sci-Fi HD
364: Sky Crime HD
365: Sky Arts HD
366: MTV HD
367: Sky Documentaries HD
368: Sky History HD
369: Sky Nature HD
385: Sky News HD
386: NBC News Now HD
473: Cartoon Network HD
474: Boomerang HD
475: Nickelodeon HD
476: Nick Jr. HD
477: Sky Kids HD

Big Sport (NOW Sky Sports Pass)

419: Sky Sports News
420: Sky Sports Main Event
421: Sky Sports Premier League
422: Sky Sports Football
423: Sky Sports Cricket
424: Sky Sports Golf
425: Sky Sports F1
426: Sky Sports Action/NFL
427: Sky Sports Arena
428: Sky Sports Racing
429: Sky Sports Mix

Big Sport (NOW Sky Sports Pass) - HD & 4K bolt-on

439: Sky Sports News HD
440: Sky Sports Main Event HD
441: Sky Sports Premier League HD
442: Sky Sports Football HD
443: Sky Sports Cricket HD
444: Sky Sports Golf HD
445: Sky Sports F1 HD
446: Sky Sports Action/NFL HD
447: Sky Sports Arena HD
448: Sky Sports Racing HD
449: Sky Sports Mix HD

Sport Pack

408: BT Sport 1
409: BT Sport 2
410: BT Sport 3
411: BT Sport 4
412: Eurosport 1
413: Eurosport 2
450: BT Sport 5
451: BT Sport 6
452: BT Sport 7
453: BT Sport 8
454: BT Sport 9
455: BT Sport 10

Sport Pack - HD & 4K bolt-on

430: BT Sport 1 HD
431: BT Sport 2 HD
432: BT Sport 3 HD
433: BT Sport Ultimate (only available on the BT YouView Ultra HD box)
434: BT Sport 4 HD
435: Eurosport 1 HD
436: Eurosport 2 HD
458: BT Sport 5 HD
459: BT Sport 6 HD
460: BT Sport 7 HD
461: BT Sport 8 HD
462: BT Sport 9 HD
463: BT Sport 10 HD

Sky Cinema bolt-on/NOW Sky Cinema Pass

500: Sky Cinema Animation
501: Sky Cinema Premiere
502: Sky Cinema Select
503: Sky Cinema Hits
504: Sky Cinema Greats
506: Sky Cinema Family
507: Sky Cinema Action
508: Sky Cinema Comedy
509: Sky Cinema Thriller
510: Sky Cinema Drama
511: Sky Cinema Sci-Fi & Horror

NOW Sky Cinema Pass - HD & 4K bolt-on

514: Sky Cinema Animation HD
515: Sky Cinema Premiere HD
516: Sky Cinema Select HD
517: Sky Cinema Hits HD
518: Sky Cinema Greats HD
520: Sky Cinema Family HD
521: Sky Cinema Action HD
522: Sky Cinema Comedy HD
523: Sky Cinema Thriller HD
524: Sky Cinema Drama HD
525: Sky Cinema Sci-Fi & Horror HD

Box Office
494: BT Sport Box Office
495: BT Sport Box Office 2 HD
496: Sky Sports Box Office HD
497: Sky Sports Box Office 2 HD
Britbox bolt-on
331: Britbox
Netflix bolt-on
333: Netflix

Amazon Prime bolt-on
334: Amazon Prime Video

These IPTV channels are only available to customers who have access to BT's Infinity fibre-optic broadband along with the relevant BT TV subscription.

The channels became available on BT's YouView service in August 2013, with new EPG numbers in the 4xx and 5xx ranges, instead of the 8xx and 9xx ranges which BT Vision had before.

Catch Up and On-Demand
BT TV Players & Apps Catch-up service is available free of charge on any package and include the following:

 BBC iPlayer
 ITVX 
 STV Player
 All 4
 My5
 BT Player
 Milkshake! (Channel 5's children's programmes)
 UKTV Play
 S4C

App access to the following services

 Netflix 
 Now
 Amazon Video

From late May 2008, BT Vision discontinued free access to BBC TV replay, instead requiring Vision users to take out a monthly subscription. However, in November 2010, BT announced that BT Vision subscribers would be able to access the BBC iPlayer from the end of June 2011. This service was built by Pushbutton for Microsoft Mediaroom.

ITV Player has been available since December 2008. Demand 5 was removed on 6 October 2010, but was reinstated in May 2011.

BT TV Store
Content is provided by:

BBC
UKTV
Crime & Investigation Network
Sky History
Comedy Central
MTV
National Geographic
ITV
Channel 4
Channel 5
Warner Bros. Television
Adult Swim
CBS Television Studios
Sony Pictures Television
Discovery Channel
ABC Studios

BT Sport
In addition to the BT Sport channels, an archive of football, wrestling, boxing, martial arts, motor sports and extreme sports matches available on-demand, with a few on a pay per view basis. This used to be called Vision Sport but has subsequently been merged with BT Sport for on-demand content and the name Vision Sport is no longer in use.

BT TV Kids
BT TV has agreed deals with:

BBC (CBBC/Cbeebies)
Nickelodeon
Cartoon Network
Boomerang
HIT Entertainment
DreamWorks Classics

BT TV Film
BT TV Film is accessed through the BT TV Player app and provides a library of the latest blockbuster films on a pay per view basis.

Films on BT TV Player mainly come from the following content providers

DreamWorks
Paramount Pictures
NBCUniversal
Lionsgate films
Buena Vista International 
Walt Disney Pictures
Touchstone Pictures
Miramax Films
Pixar
Warner Bros.
Momentum Pictures
MGM
Artificial Eye

BT TV also gives users access to Curzon Home Cinema directly from their BT TV YouView box within the BT TV Player app where they can purchase some of the latest films without the need to connect to a different device.

BT Music
BT TV has agreed deals with:
Sony BMG
EMI Music
Universal Music
Warner Music Group
NBD
Planet Rock

who provide over 1,500 music videos, concerts and music documentaries, on-demand available for rent without the need for a BT TV Music Bolt-on.

YouView from BT
On 21 September 2012, BT, one of the partners of YouView, announced that they would provide a free YouView box to its broadband subscribers. This new service will allow customers to access BT Vision's on demand content, YouView's EPG technologies such as 'scrollback', and Now TV. This came weeks after TalkTalk launched its new YouView-based TV service TalkTalk Plus TV. YouView from BT launched on 26 October 2012.

On 27 June 2013, the CEO of BT's TV division, Marc Watson, said that BT Vision will be rebranded as 'BT TV', together with the YouView service under an umbrella brand. BT aimed to offer sports on the YouView service. However, on 1 August 2013, BT was refused by rival BSkyB to broadcast Sky Sports on BT's YouView service. This meant that the Vision+ box would continue to be distributed for the purpose of Sky Sports and the extra linear channels (as of 27 June), as long until these features would be finally available on BT YouView.

On 9 August 2013, the 18 extra linear channels from BT Vision were successfully added to the BT YouView EPG and ready for streaming. Just two days prior to this, both BT and TalkTalk asked Digital UK to expand the streamed IP channel range from 400–499 to 400–599, as they both claim to launch over a hundred new streamed channels via YouView.

Vision+ PVR
The Vision+ is a set-top box, similar to Sky+ and V+, that enables 100 hours of television programmes to be recorded while watching other live programmes. The service is described as providing a range of on-demand content without compulsory subscriptions. However, a BT broadband connection with a guaranteed line speed is required. A self-install version and a technician install version of BT Vision are available. This box can access standard definition Freeview broadcasts where available, on-demand SD and HD content from BT, along with linear VOD channels through BT Infinity.

The original silver Vision+ box is a Toshiba HDTV9719 running Saorview software for the IPTV signals. The OS is BT TV. The next generation Vision+ box was made by Motorola. The new black Vision+ box is made by Pace.

BT released a new Humax set top box in late 2012 offering Freeview HD services, linear VOD HD channels through BT Infinity, and on-demand boxsets, catchup TV and other new features as part of the YouView service.

The original silver Vision+ boxes will be no use after 30 June 2014. All customers will get a free upgrade to YouView, worth £199, if they recontract for 18 months. Users of the black Vision+ boxes are unaffected.

Launch packages
The newly rebranded BT TV had three packages as of 10 August 2013: TV Essential, Essential Extra, and Unlimited Extra. All packages came with a YouView box with Freeview television and radio channels, catch-up TV and the ability to pause, record and rewind live TV. A Vision+ box was provided for Sky Sports customers, until 30 June 2014.

Vision TV, Music, Kids and Sport were on-demand. All cost 50p a show with TV Essential, and were free and unlimited with TV Unlimited. Vision Filmclub was available for free with TV Unlimited, and is not available for TV Essential.

Vision Box Office was on a pay per view basis, available with both TV Essential and TV Unlimited.

April 2015 packages
On 24 April 2015 BT TV launched revised packages as follows:

 Starter – Freeview, Catch Up TV, BT Sport, AMC, Pause & Rewind (Set Top Box supplied does not record)
 Entertainment Plus – As per Starter plus with ability to Record TV, 28 linear IPTV channels and Mobile App access to IPTV
 Total Entertainment – As per Entertainment Plus with inclusive Ultra HD, HD Extra and Kids Extra bolt ons

BT customers without Infinity broadband can only obtain the Starter package, with BT Sport only available on Starter via IPTV in certain areas. Entertainment packages are only available to those with Infinity broadband.

Unicast IPTV streaming bolt-ons for Netflix, BT Kids (children's content) or BT Music content can be added to all packages.
Multicast IPTV Bolt-ons for Sky Sports Main Event & Extra, Sky Movies and HD channels can only be added to Entertainment packages.

BT Sport and AMC channels are available free of charge for customers with BT Infinity fibre-optic broadband. For customers who don't have access to BT's fibre-optic network, these can watch these channels via DTT on a Vision+ box. On 24 January 2014 BT ceased to sell BT Sport via DTT, and subsequently ceased provision of BT Sport 2 via DTT on 1 January 2015. BT Sport 1 ended on DTT on 2 June 2015.

References

External links
 BT Vision, official site.

BT Group
Television in the United Kingdom
Mass media companies of the United Kingdom
Video on demand services
Mass media companies established in 2006
Pay television